Afriyie is the second studio album by Ghanaian/Canadian Singer-Songwriter Kae Sun.  It was released on May 28, 2013.

Track listing

 Blackstar Rising
 Heart Healing Pulse
 Lion Unleashed
 Burden Of Love
 Ship and The Globe
 Dzorwulu Junction
 Lead Loaded Letters
 When The Pot
 Weh-Weh
 Stillness

References

Kae Sun albums
2013 albums